This is a list of programs broadcast by Disney Channel (Scandinavia). It does not include Disney XD, Disney Junior, Toon Disney, Playhouse Disney, Fox Kids or Jetix programs. Almost every program on the channel is dubbed into Danish, Swedish and Norwegian, with some programs also available in Finnish or Russian as well.

Current programming (new episodes or reruns)

Animated
 Phineas and Ferb
 DuckTales
 Big City Greens
 Amphibia
 The Owl House
 Brandy & Mr. Whiskers
 The Ghost and Molly McGee Spider-Man Rapunzel's Tangled AdventureDisney Junior programming
 Art Attack (Scandinavian version)
 Henry Hugglemonster PJ MasksLive-actionBunk'dStuck in the MiddleRaven's HomeGabby Duran and the UnsittablesJessieSydney to the MaxK.C. UndercoverJust Roll with ItCoop & Cami Ask the WorldSecrets of Sulphur SpringsDog with a BlogDisney Fam Jam (English language only)Austin and AllyGood Luck CharlieViolettaEU/UK shows
 Rolling with the Ronks! Miraculous: Tales of Ladybug and Cat Noir Dude, That's My Ghost! 101 Dalmatian Street Space Chickens in Space Ghostforce Best Bugs Forever The Evermoor Chronicles Kid vs. Kat Binny and the Ghost
 The Lodge
 Alex & Co.
 Penny on M.A.R.S.

Former programming

 101 Dalmatians: The Series
 The 7D
 A.N.T. Farm 
 Adventures of the Gummi Bears
 Air Disney
 A Kind of Magic
 Aladdin
 American Dragon: Jake Long
 Andi Mack (English language only)
 As the Bell Rings
 Atomic Puppet
 Backstage
 Bear in the Big Blue House
 Big Hero 6: The Series
 Bizaardvark
 The Book of Pooh
 Boy Meets World (English language only)
 Buzz Lightyear of Star Command
 The Buzz on Maggie
 Chuggington
 Cory in the House (English language only)
 Counterfeit Cat
 Dave the Barbarian
 Darkwing Duck
 Descendants: Wicked World
 Dinosaurs (English language only)
 Disney 11
 Doug (Disney seasons only)
 DuckTales (1987 TV series)
 Elena of Avalor
 The Fairly OddParents (Nelvana seasons only)
 Famous 5: On the Case
 Fillmore!
 Fish Hooks
 Gamer's Guide to Pretty Much Everything
 Girl Meets World
 Goldie and Bear
 Good Luck Charlie
 Goof Troop
 Gravity Falls
 H2O: Just Add Water
 Handy Manny
 Hannah Montana
 Higglytown Heroes
 Home Improvement (English language only)
 Hotel Transylvania: The Series
 House of Mouse
 I Didn't Do It
 Imagination Movers
 Jake and Blake
 Jake and the Never Land Pirates
 JoJo's Circus
 Jonas L.A.
 Jungle Cubs
 
 Kick Buttowski: Suburban Daredevil
 Kirby Buckets
 Kim Possible
 Lab Rats
 Lab Rats: Elite Force
 LazyTown
 Lilo and Stitch: The Series
 The Lion Guard
 Little Einsteins
 Lloyd in Space
 Mech-X4
 Mickey Mouse
 Mickey Mouse Clubhouse
 Mickey and the Roadster Racers
 Mighty Med
 Milo Murphy's Law
 Minnie's Bow-Toons
 My Babysitter's a Vampire
 My Camp Rock
  The New Adventures of Winnie the Pooh Packages from Planet X Pair of Kings Pepper Ann Phil of the Future (English language only)
 Pickle and Peanut Pippi Longstocking PrankStars Puppy Dog Pals Quack Pack Randy Cunningham: 9th Grade Ninja Recess The Replacements Right Now Kapow Rolie Polie Olie Scaredy Squirrel Shane's Kindergarten Countdown Shanna's Show Smart Guy (English language only)
 Stanley Sweet Valley High Shake It Up Sonny with a Chance Soy Luna Star Wars Rebels Star Wars: Forces of Destiny Stitch! The Suite Life of Zack & Cody The Suite Life on Deck Take Two with Phineas and Ferb TaleSpin Teacher's Pet Teen Angel (English language only)
 That's So Raven (English language only)
 This Is Who I Am Timon and Pumbaa Totally Spies! Troll Tales Ultimate Spider-Man Vampirina Wander Over Yonder The Weekenders Wizards of Waverly Place''

External links
 Official Danish website (in Danish)
 Official Swedish website (in Swedish)
 Official Norwegian website (in Norwegian)

Disney Channel (Scandinavia)
 Scandinavia
Disney Channel related-lists